A dive bomber is a bomber aircraft that dives directly at its targets.

Dive Bomber may also refer to:
Dive Bomber (film)
Dive Bomber (video game)
Dive Bomber, a type of amusement ride
Rat runner, someone who takes a circuitous shortcut around traffic

See also
Dive-bomb (disambiguation)